Evstaphiy Pechlevanidis, also known as Yevstafi Alkiviadorovich Pekhlevanidi (born 29 October 1960 in Shymkent, Kazakh SSR) is a retired Soviet and Greek professional football player. He is of Caucasus Greek ethnic origin and immigrated from the Soviet Union to Greece in 1990.

His father Alkiviad Pekhlevanidi played for FC Dinamo Tbilisi in the 1940s.

Honours
 USSR Federation Cup winner: 1988.

References

External links
 Career summary by KLISF

1960 births
Living people
Pontic Greeks
Soviet footballers
Greek footballers
Greek expatriate footballers
Soviet Top League players
Super League Greece players
FC Kairat players
Levadiakos F.C. players
Kazakhstani people of Greek descent
Soviet people of Greek descent
Soviet emigrants to Greece
Association football forwards
People from Shymkent